This is a list of destinations currently and formerly served by SATA Air Açores, which operates domestically within the two autonomous regions of Portugal, consisting of the Azores and Madeira. The list does not include the international operations of its subsidiary Azores Airlines.

Destinations

See also
 List of Azores Airlines destinations

Lists of airline destinations
Azores-related lists